David Charles Robert Manners, 11th Duke of Rutland (born 8 May 1959), is a British hereditary peer and landowner.

Biography
Rutland is the elder son of the 10th Duke of Rutland by his second wife, the former Frances Sweeny, now the Dowager Duchess.  He was educated at Stanbridge Earls School, near Romsey in Hampshire, which has since closed. He succeeded his father in the titles on 4 January 1999.

He has a younger brother, Lord Edward Manners, a sister, Lady Teresa Manners, and a half-sister, Lady Charlotte Manners.

Rutland's ancestral home is Belvoir Castle in the northern part of Leicestershire. The Sunday Times Rich List 2013 estimated his personal fortune at £125 million, but he had to sell a painting to keep Belvoir Castle maintained.

The Duke was a high-profile supporter of the UK Independence Party (UKIP) and has hosted fundraising events at Belvoir Castle. In 1999, he stood for UKIP when the House of Lords had to elect 92 hereditary peers. He stood in a House of Lords by-election in 2005 and again in 2015.

In the summer of 2005, Rutland bought the Manners Arms Country Hotel and Restaurant in Knipton near Grantham, which had been built for the 6th Duke of Rutland as a hunting lodge during the 1880s. The Duchess took a leading part in the renovation work they carried out on the property.

In July 2018, the Duke came under scrutiny for advertising positions for actors to perform unpaid at Belvoir Castle. Performers' union Equity criticised the advertisement, saying it was "unacceptable" to ask actors to work unpaid; the advertisement was later removed.

Marriage and children
Rutland married Emma Watkins, daughter of a Welsh farmer from Knighton, Powys, on 6 June 1992 at Belvoir Castle. They separated in 2012. The couple have five children:

 Lady Violet Diana Louise Manners (born 18 August 1993)
 Lady Alice Louisa Lilly Manners (born 27 April 1995)
 Lady Eliza Charlotte Manners (born 17 July 1997)
 Charles John Montague Manners, Marquess of Granby (born 3 July 1999)
 Lord Hugo William James Manners (born 24 July 2003)

The Duchess runs the commercial activities of Belvoir Castle, including shooting parties, weddings and a range of furniture.

Coat of arms

References

External links

Rutland, David Manners, 11th Duke of
Rutland, David Manners, 11th Duke of
People educated at Stanbridge Earls School
111
D
UK Independence Party politicians
British landowners
Rutland